Hossein Nokhodkar (born February 24, 2002) is an Iranian football forward who currently plays for Saipa in the Persian Gulf Pro League.

Club career

Saipa
He made his debut for Saipa in first fixtures of 2018–19 Iran Pro League against Sepidrood Rasht while he substituted in for Rahim Zahivi.

Honours

International 
Iran U16
 AFC U-16 Championship runner-up: 2016

References

External links
 Hossein Nokhodkar at PersianLeague.com

Living people
2002 births
Association football forwards
Iranian footballers
Saipa F.C. players
Persian Gulf Pro League players
People from Karaj
21st-century Iranian people